Abraham Leon Kornzweig, (September 18, 1900 – June 20, 1982), born in New York, a physician and ophthalmologist specializing in geriatric ophthalmology. He opened a new field in investigative medicine, and founded the Society of Geriatric Ophthalmology. He was also widely known as the co-discoverer and namer of Bassen-Kornzweig Syndrome, also called Abetalipoproteinemia. It was first noted by the United States physician Frank Bassen, who partnered with Kornzweig to identify and describe causes and symptoms of the disease.

Biography
Born in New York City, Kornzweig graduated from Columbia University in 1922, and from the New York University School of Medicine in 1925. From 1925 to 1928, He trained as an intern at Mount Sinai Hospital, New York, including study in pathology under the well-known Bernard Samuels, after which he entered private practice until 1934. He returned to Mount Sinai for a residency in ophthalmology and in 1936, received a diplomate. For 17 years, he taught at NYU-Bellevue Medical School, where he was an Associate Clinical Professor; he subsequently taught at Mount Sinai School of Medicine, where he was Clinical Professor, and eventually Emeritus Professor, of Ophthalmology. He was also Director of Research and Chief of Ophthalmology at the Jewish Home and Hospital for the Aged.

He retired in poor health in 1972, although he continued to work on his research projects until his death in 1982.

He married Chifra Goldberg, a naturalized citizen, born in Yass, Rumania and they had one daughter.

Disease

Bassen-Kornzweig disease, also called Bassen-Kornzweig Syndrome, is a rare congenital disorder in which the body fails to produce chylomicrons, a low density lipoprotein (LDL) and very low density lipoprotein (VLDL). Individuals with this condition are unable to properly digest fats. Symptoms include ataxia, peripheral neuropathy and other forms of nerve dysfunction. Treatment includes vitamin E.

Characteristics of the syndrome include the presence of acanthocytes (burr-cell malformation of the erythrocytes), and the reduction or even absence of B-lipoproteins. Complications include retinitis pigmentosa, degenerative changes in the central nervous system involving the cerebellum and long tracts, fatty diarrhea, ataxia, areflexia, demyelination, defective intestinal lipid absorption with low serum cholesterol level, intestinal malabsorption, amaurosis, retarded growth, and steatorrhea. Intellectual development may be slightly retarded.
Many afflicted with the syndrome are unable to walk.

The syndrome appears in infancy. Affected children appear normal at birth but usually fail to thrive during their first year. The syndrome may predominate in males (71%). Most cases occur in children of Jewish descent, especially among  Ashkenazi Jews. The disease is transmitted as an autosomal recessive trait. It is also commonly recognized as a betalipoprotein deficiency or abetalipoproteinemia.

Publications
Kornzweig's publications include over 50 articles and books, beginning in 1948 with a series of articles on the "Eye in Old Age", and concluding with, in 1980, "New Ideas for the Old Eye."

Partial list
Frank A. Bassen, M.D. and Abraham L. Kornzweig, M.D. "Malformation of the Erythrocytes in a Case of atypical Retinitis Pigmentosa." Blood,  1950, Vol. 5, No. 4, pp. 381–387.
Abraham L. Kornzweig, M.D.; Frank A. Bassen M.D. "Retinitis Pigmentosa, Acanthocytosis, and Heredodegenerative Neuromuscular Disease." AMA Arch Ophthalmology.  1957;58(2):183–187. 
Abraham L. Kornzweig, MD; Ira Eliasoph, MD; Morris Feldstein, MD.  "Selective Atrophy of the Radial Peripapillary Capillaries in Chronic Glaucoma." Archives of  Ophthalmology. 1968;80(6):696–702. 
Abraham L. Kornzweig, MD; Ira Eliasoph, MD; Morris Feldstein, MD. "The Retinal Vasculature in Macular Degeneration." Archives of  Ophthalmology. 1966;75(3):326–333.
Abraham L. Kornzweig, MD; Ira Eliasoph, MD; Morris Feldstein, MD. "Occlusive Disease of Retinal Vasculature." Archives of  Ophthalmology.  1964;71(4):542–551. 
Morris Feldstein, M.D.; Abraham L. Kornzweig, M.D.; Julius Schneider, M.D. "Ocular Surgery in the Aged" Journal of the American Medical Association.  1959;170(14):1621–1625.

See also
Neuroacanthocytosis

Sources

1900 births
1982 deaths
American ophthalmologists
Columbia University alumni
New York University Grossman School of Medicine alumni
People from New York City